"Get It Wet" is the second single released from Twista's third album, Adrenaline Rush. The song featured a verse from rapper, Ms. Kane and was produced by The Legendary Traxster. "Get It Wet" was Twista's first to make it to the Billboard Hot 100, peaking at 96 on the chart.

Single track listing
"Get It Wet" (Album Version)- 4:03  
"Get It Wet" (Instrumental)- 4:04  
"Mobster's Anthem" (Album Version)- 4:36  
"Mobster's Anthem" (Instrumental)- 4:37

Charts

1997 singles
Twista songs
Songs written by Twista
Music videos directed by Dave Meyers (director)
1997 songs
Atlantic Records singles